Diamante do Norte is a municipality in the state of Paraná in the Southern Region of Brazil.

The municipality contains the  Caiuá Ecological Station, created in 1994 as compensation for flooding caused by the Rosana Dam on the Paranapanema River.

See also
List of municipalities in Paraná

References

Municipalities in Paraná